Ian Mitchell (born January 18, 1999) is a Canadian professional ice hockey defenceman currently playing with the  Chicago Blackhawks in the National Hockey League (NHL).

Playing career
He played college hockey at the University of Denver and was named AHCA First-Team All-American his junior season. Mitchell was selected 57th overall by the Chicago Blackhawks in the 2017 NHL Entry Draft. On April 11, 2020, Mitchell agreed to an entry-level contract with the Blackhawks, forgoing his senior season at Denver. Mitchell scored his first goal in the 2022-2023 season on January 22, 2023 against the Los Angeles Kings.

Career statistics

Regular season and playoffs

International

Awards and honors

References

External links
 

1999 births
Living people
Canadian ice hockey defencemen
Chicago Blackhawks draft picks
Chicago Blackhawks players
Denver Pioneers men's ice hockey players
Ice hockey people from Alberta
Rockford IceHogs (AHL) players
Sportspeople from St. Albert, Alberta
Spruce Grove Saints players
AHCA Division I men's ice hockey All-Americans